Savo Sovre (7 July 1928 – 2008) was a Slovene painter also known for his illustrations of children's books.

He won the Levstik Award in 1964 for his illustrations for a Primary School German Exercise Book, but also illustrated many picture books and children's magazines.

He founded the Sovre Art School in Ljubljana.

References

Slovenian male painters
Slovenian illustrators
Slovenian children's book illustrators
1928 births
2008 deaths
Levstik Award laureates
University of Ljubljana alumni
People from Ormož
20th-century Slovenian painters
20th-century Slovenian male artists